Tough Love: Miami (season 4) is the fourth season of the American reality television series Tough Love, which first aired on VH1. The show features eight women seeking relationship advice from the host and matchmaker, Steven Ward, and his mother JoAnn Ward, both of the Philadelphia-based Master Matchmakers. This season, Tough Love takes place in Miami Beach, Florida.

Boot Campers

Episode Progress

 The contestant had the best progress/date of the week
 The contestant was commended for good progress/date
 The contestant had average progress/date
 The contestant had poor progress/date
 The contestant had the worst progress/date of the week and was in the hot seat.
 The contestant left boot camp. 
 The contestant had good progress and was in the hot seat.

References

External sources
 MasterMatchmakers.com

2011 American television seasons
VH1 original programming
2010s American reality television series
Television shows set in Miami